The Ministry of Agriculture is a ministry of the Government of Tanzania.

History 
The ministry was formed following the split of the Ministry of Agriculture, Livestock and Fisheries in October 2017 to improve efficiency, with the livestock and fisheries roles being created into the Ministry of Livestock and Fisheries.

Ministers 
 Parties

References

External links 
 

A
Tanzania
Agricultural organisations based in Tanzania